Mădălin Staicu (born 16 July 1990) is a Romanian former footballer who played in Liga I for Ceahlăul Piatra Neamț.

References

External links
 

1990 births
Living people
Sportspeople from Piatra Neamț
Romanian footballers
Association football midfielders
Liga I players
CSM Ceahlăul Piatra Neamț players